The Jaguar's Claws is a 1917 American Western silent film directed by Marshall Neilan and written by William M. McCoy, Beatrice DeMille and Leighton Osmun. The film stars Sessue Hayakawa, Fritzi Brunette, Tom Moore, Marjorie Daw, Tom Forman and Mabel Van Buren. The film was released on June 11, 1917, by Paramount Pictures.

Plot

Cast 
 Sessue Hayakawa as El Jaguar
 Fritzi Brunette as Beth Thomas
 Tom Moore as Phil Jordan
 Marjorie Daw as Nancy Jordan
 Tom Forman as Harry Knowles
 Mabel Van Buren as Marie
 Horace B. Carpenter 
 Lucien Littlefield

References

External links 
 

1917 films
1917 Western (genre) films
Paramount Pictures films
Films directed by Marshall Neilan
American black-and-white films
Silent American Western (genre) films
1910s English-language films
1910s American films